Gertrudis is a 1992 Mexican biographical film about the life and execution of Gertrudis Bocanegra, a noted female insurgent of the Mexican War of Independence. It stars Ofelia Medina in the title role and was directed by her brother, Ernesto Medina.

Cast
 Ofelia Medina as Gertrudis Bocanegra
 Angélica Aragón as Pilar Molina
 Fernando Balzaretti as Miguel Alzate
 Mónica Miguel as Nana
 Eduardo Palomo as Esteban Díaz
 César Évora as Pedro Advíncula
 Jorge Russek as Sr. Bocanegra

Production
The film was based on "the only two biographies written of this woman [Bocanegra]". Ofelia Medina, who co-wrote the screenplay with Eduardo Casar, stated: "The documents are minimal, with very few pages; we totally respected what they say, but it was necessary to create an element of romance around Gertrudis, since nothing is known of her personal relationships".

Mónica Miguel was cast as Bocanegra's unnamed Purépecha nanny (called "nana" in the film) who teaches Bocanegra the Purépecha language. In an interview, the actress commented on her character's overall importance: "And it is a very deep character, because it represents all the Purépecha race, with all its history, and hopefully more movies related to our culture, traditions and history will be made".

The film was shot on location at Pátzcuaro, Erongarícuaro, Tzintzuntzan, and Zirahuén.

Accolades
In 1993, Gertrudis won the Ariel Award for Best Costume Design (Mara González and Xóchitl Vivo). It was also nominated for Best Supporting Actress (Angélica Aragón), Best Music Theme (Leonardo Velázquez), and Best First Work (Ernesto Medina).

References

External links
 

1992 films
1992 drama films
1990s biographical drama films
Mexican biographical drama films
Mexican War of Independence films
Films set in Mexico
Films set in the 1780s
Films set in the 1790s
Films set in the 1810s
Films about capital punishment
1990s Spanish-language films
1990s Mexican films